The Centro di Documentazione Ebraica Contemporanea (Center of Contemporary Jewish Documentation; CDEC) is an independent cultural and historical institution in Milan, Italy, dedicated to promoting the study of the events, culture, and circumstances of the Jewish People in Italy in the context of modern times.

The CDEC was founded in 1955 at the initiative of the Italian Jewish Youth Federation (Federazione Giovanile Ebraica Italiana). Its stated objective: the research and documentation of all forms of anti-semitic persecution in Italy, and the Jews' contribution to the Resistance in Italy. (per the CDEC charter, 1957) 

Since 1986, the Center operates as a not-for-profit Foundation, under the name La Fondazione Centro di Documentazione Ebraica Contemporanea — CDEC. 
Michele Sarfatti has served as the Foundation's director during the years 2002–16.

Activities

Departments
The Center functions as a study and research facility. It curates exhibitions and organizes encounters between students and docents. Its operations are divided between the following departments:
 Library
 Media center
 Historical archive
 Archive of Prejudice
 Teaching the Holocaust

Digital exhibition
In late 2006, the CDEC inaugurated its website offering a digital exhibition of its holdings. Thousands of items, comprising photographs, letters, journals, memoirs, and official documents, tell the story of Jewish life in Italy from the mid-19th century to the years of persecution at the start of the Second World War, through the Holocaust, and into the postwar period. The site, presently in Italian, is due to be translated into English.

Righteous Among the Nations
The CDEC Foundation represents Italy in the recognition of the "Righteous Among the Nations."

Collaborations with other institutions
The CDEC operates in collaboration with Holocaust documentation institutions worldwide, including:
 Yad Vashem in Jerusalem
 The Austrian Holocaust Memorial Service

External links 
Official website
Digital exhibition

Archives in Italy
Libraries in Milan
Jewish Italian history
Judaism in Italy
Holocaust commemoration
Libraries established in 1955
Organisations based in Milan
Religious organisations based in Italy
Jewish organizations established in 1955
1955 establishments in Italy
Culture in Milan